Camargue (also , ,) is a natural region in southern France located south of the city of Arles, between the Mediterranean Sea and the two arms of the Rhône river delta. The eastern arm is called the Grand Rhône; the western one is the Petit Rhône. It constitutes western Europe's largest river delta.

Administratively it lies within the department of Bouches-du-Rhône (Mouths of the Rhône); it covers parts of the territory of the communes of Arles, Saintes-Maries-de-la-Mer and Port-Saint-Louis-du-Rhône. A further expanse of marshy plain, known as the "Petite Camargue" (Little Camargue), just to the west of the "Petit Rhône", lies within the department of Gard.

Camargue was designated a Ramsar site as a "Wetland of International Importance" on 1 December 1986. The Petite Camargue followed on 8 January 1996.

Geography

It is a vast plain comprising large brine lagoons or étangs, cut off from the sea by sandbars and encircled by reed-covered marshes. These are in turn surrounded by a large cultivated area.

Approximately a third of Camargue is either lakes or marshland. The central area around the shoreline of the Étang de Vaccarès has been protected as a regional park since 1927, in recognition of its great importance as a haven for wild birds. In 2008, it was incorporated into the larger Parc naturel régional de Camargue.

Flora and fauna

Camargue is home to more than 400 species of birds and has been identified as an Important Bird Area (IBA) by BirdLife International. Its brine ponds provide one of the few European habitats for the greater flamingo. The marshes are also a prime habitat for many species of insects, notably (and notoriously) some of the most ferocious mosquitos to be found anywhere in France. Camargue horses (Camarguais) roam the extensive marshlands, along with Camargue cattle.

The native flora of Camargue have adapted to the saline conditions. Sea lavender and glasswort flourish, along with tamarisks and reeds.

Regional park

This territory is some of the most natural and most protected in all of Europe. A roadside museum provides background on flora, fauna, as well as the history of the area.

Human influence 
Humans have lived in Camargue for millennia, greatly affecting it with drainage schemes, dykes, rice paddies and salt pans. Much of the outer Camargue has been drained for agricultural purposes.

Camargue has an eponymous horse breed, the white Camarguais. Camargue horses are ridden by the gardians (cowboys), who rear the region's cattle for fighting bulls for regional use and for export to Spain, as well as sheep. Many of these animals are raised in semi-feral conditions, allowed to roam through Camargue within a manade, or free-running herd. They are periodically rounded up for culling, medical treatment, or other events.

Few towns of any size have developed in Camargue. Arles has been called its "capital", located at the extreme north of the delta where the Rhône forks into its two principal branches. The medieval fortress-town of Aigues-Mortes is located on the far western edge, in the Petite Camargue. Saintes-Maries-de-la-Mer is the destination of the annual Romani pilgrimage for the veneration of Saint Sarah.

Camargue was exploited in the Middle Ages by Cistercian and Benedictine monks. In the 16th–17th centuries, big estates, known locally as mas, were founded by rich landlords from Arles. At the end of the 18th century, they had the Rhône diked to protect the town and their properties from flooding. In 1858, the building of the digue à la mer (dyke to the sea) achieved temporary protection of the delta from erosion, but it is a changing landform, always affected by waters and weather.

The north of Camargue is agricultural land. The main crops are cereals, grapevine and rice. Near the seashore, prehistoric man started extracting salt, a practice that continues today. Salt was a source of wealth for the Cistercian "salt abbeys" of Ulmet, Franquevaux and Psalmody in the Middle Ages. Industrial salt collection started in the 19th century, and big chemical companies such as Péchiney and Solvay founded the "mining" city of Salin-de-Giraud.

The boundaries of Camargue are constantly revised by the Rhône as it transports huge quantities of mud downstream – as much as 20 million m3 annually. Some of the étangs are the remnants of old arms and legs of the river. The general trend is for the coastline to move outwards as new earth is deposited in the delta at the river's mouth. The pace of change has been modified in recent years by man-made barriers, such as dams on the Rhône and sea dykes, but flooding remains a problem across the region.

See also
 Bac du Sauvage
 Camargue cattle
 Camargue equitation
 Camargue horse
 Camargue red rice
 Folco de Baroncelli-Javon
 Gardian
 Manade

References

Further reading 
 – also in jstor (paywall)

External links

 or the "Camargue Nation"

 
Landforms of Bouches-du-Rhône
Arles
Marshes of France
Ramsar sites in Metropolitan France
Biosphere reserves of France
River deltas of Europe
Birdwatching sites in France
Important Bird Areas of France
Natural regions of France
Landforms of Provence-Alpes-Côte d'Azur